Ingenbohl (High Alemannic: Ingäbohl) is a municipality in Schwyz District in the canton of Schwyz in Switzerland.

History
Ingenbohl is first mentioned in 1387 as uff Ingenbol.

Geography

Of this area, 31% is used for agricultural purposes, while 49.1% is forested. Of the rest of the land, 16.1% is settled (buildings or roads) and the remainder (3.8%) is non-productive (rivers, glaciers or mountains).

Ingenbohl is located along the Lake of Lucerne.  It consists of the village of Ingenbohl and the hamlets of Brunnen, Wilen, Schränggigen and Unterschönenbuch as well as scattered farm houses.

Demographics
, 19.4% of the population was made up of foreign nationals. Over the last 10 years the population has grown at a rate of 16.1%. Most of the population speaks German  (88.9%), with Serbo-Croatian being second most common ( 3.5%) and Italian being third ( 2.4%).

 the gender distribution of the population was 45.2% male and 54.8% female.  The age distribution, in Ingenbohl is; 1,724 people or 23.0% of the population is between 0 and 19.  2,069 people or 27.7% are 20 to 39, and 2,325 people or 31.1% are 40 to 64.  The senior population distribution is 667 people or 8.9% are 65 to 74.  There are 470 people or 6.3% who are 70 to 79 and 227 people or 3.03% of the population who are over 80.  There is one person in Ingenbohl who is over 100 years old.

 there are 2,899 households, of which 892 households (or about 30.8%) contain only a single individual.  148 or about 5.1% are large households, with at least five members.

In the 2007 election the most popular party was the SVP which received 38.1% of the vote.  The next three most popular parties were the CVP (29.4%), the SPS (16.1%) and the FDP (12.2%).

The entire Swiss population is generally well educated.  In Ingenbohl about 68.5% of the population (between age 25-64) have completed either non-mandatory upper secondary education or additional higher education (either university or a Fachhochschule).

Ingenbohl has an unemployment rate of 1.8%.  , there were 109 people employed in the primary economic sector and about 39 businesses involved in this sector.  452 people are employed in the secondary sector and there are 61 businesses in this sector.  2,127 people are employed in the tertiary sector, with 272 businesses in this sector.

Of the rest of the population,  there are 5 individuals (or about 0.07% of the population) who belong to the Christian Catholic faith, there are 191 individuals (or about 2.55% of the population) who belong to the Orthodox Church, and there are less than 5 individuals who belong to another Christian church. There are 5 individuals (or about 0.07% of the population) who are Jewish, and 276 (or about 3.69% of the population) who are Islamic. There are 59 individuals (or about 0.79% of the population) who belong to another church (not listed on the census), 300 (or about 4.01% of the population) belong to no church, are agnostic or atheist, and 168 individuals (or about 2.25% of the population) did not answer the question.

The historical population is given in the following table:

Transport
Brunnen railway station, on the Gotthard railway, is served by hourly InterRegio trains, and by lines S2 of the Stadtbahn Zug, which operates hourly between Zug, Arth-Goldau and Erstfeld, and S3 of the S-Bahn Luzern, which operates hourly to Lucerne.

References

External links

 

Municipalities of the canton of Schwyz